Palmaria palmata, also called dulse, dillisk or dilsk (from Irish/Scottish Gaelic /), red dulse, sea lettuce flakes, or creathnach, is a red alga (Rhodophyta) previously referred to as Rhodymenia palmata. It grows on the northern coasts of the Atlantic and Pacific Oceans. It is a well-known snack food.

History
The earliest record of this species is on the island of Iona, Scotland where Christian monks harvested it over 1,400 years ago.

Description
The erect frond of dulse grows attached by its discoid holdfast and a short inconspicuous stipe epiphytically on to the stipe of Laminaria or to rocks. The fronds are variable in shape and colour from deep rose to reddish purple and are rather leathery in texture. The blade consists of an outer cortex of small cells enclosing a medulla of larger cells up to 0.35 thick.

The reference to Rhodymenia palmata var. mollis in Abbott and Hollenberg (1976), is now considered to refer to a different species: Palmaria mollis (Setchel et Gardner) van der Meer et Bird.

Unlike P. palmata, it is not branched and does not have proliferations or branches from the edge of the frond, although the older blades may split.

Life history

The full life history was not fully explained until 1980. There are two phases in the life-history, that is it is dioecious,  male and female plants grow separately. The large plants are male or have sporangia. The female plants are minute, less than 1 mm) and become overgrown after fertilization by the diploid plant. Tetraspores occur in scattered patches sori (spores) on the mature blade, diploid blade. Spermatial sori occur scattered over most of the frond of the haploid (single cell) male plant. The female gametophyte is very small stunted or encrusted, the carpogonia, the female nucleus, apparently occurring as single cells in the young plants. The male plants are blade-like and produce spermatia which fertilize the carpogonia of the female crust. The adult tetrasporophyte produces tetraspores meiotically in fours.

Ecology
P. palmata is to be found growing from mid-tide of the intertidal zone (the area between the high tide and low tide) to depths of 20 m or more in sheltered and exposed shores.

Culinary use

Dulse is commonly used as food and medicine in Ireland, Iceland, Atlantic Canada, and the Northeastern United States. It can be found in many health food stores or fish markets and can be ordered directly from local distributors. It is also used as fodder for animals in some countries.

Dulse is a good source of minerals and vitamins compared with other vegetables, contains all trace elements needed by humans, and has a high protein content. Dulse contains iodine, which prevents goitre.

It is commonly found from June to September and can be picked by hand when the tide is out. When picked, small snails, shell pieces, and other small particles can be washed or shaken off the plant, which is then spread to dry. Some gatherers may turn it once and roll it into large bales to be packaged later.

Fresh dulse can be eaten directly off the rocks before sun-drying. Sun-dried dulse is eaten as is or is ground to flakes or a powder. When used in cooking, dulse's properties are similar to those of a flavour-enhancer. In Iceland, the tradition is to eat it with butter.. It can be pan-fried quickly into chips, baked in the oven covered with cheese, with salsa, or simply microwaved briefly. It can be used in soups, chowders, sandwiches, and salads, or added to bread or pizza dough. Finely diced, it can be used as a flavour enhancer in meat dishes, such as chili, in place of monosodium glutamate.

In Ireland dulse can be used to make "White Soda Bread". In Ballycastle, Northern Ireland, it is traditionally sold at the Ould Lammas Fair. It is particularly popular along the Causeway Coast. Although a fast-dying tradition, many gather their own dulse. Along the Ulster coastline from County Down to County Donegal, it is eaten dried and uncooked as a snack. It is commonly referred to as dillisk on the west coast of Ireland. Dillisk is usually dried and sold as a snack food from stalls in seaside towns by periwinkle sellers.

Researchers at Oregon State University's Hatfield Marine Science Center have selected a fast-growing strain of Pacific dulse (P. mollis). Originally intended as a feed for abalone farming, they claim their strain of the seaweed tastes like bacon when fried.

Distribution
P. palmata is the only species of Palmaria found on the coast of Atlantic Europe. It can be found from Portugal to the Baltic coasts and on the coasts of Iceland and the Faroe Islands. It also grows on the shores of Arctic Russia, Arctic Canada, Atlantic Canada, Alaska, Japan, and Korea. Records of P. palmaria from California are actually of Palmaria mollis.

Parasites and diseases
Galls, possibly produced by parasitic nematodes, copepods, or bacteria, are known to infect these plants. They were recorded as "outgrowths of tissue produced by the presence...of an animal."

References

Further reading
 Grubb, V.M. 1923. Preliminary note on the reproduction of Rhodymenia palmata, Ag. Annals of Botany 37: 151–52.
 Pueschel, C.M. 1979. Ultrastructure of the tetrasporogenesis in Palmaria palmata (Rhodophyta). Journal of Phycology 15: 409–424.
 South, G.R. and Hooper, R.G. 1980. A Catalogue and Atlas of the Benthic Marine Algae of the Island of Newfoundland. pp. 1–136. Memorial University of Newfoundland Occasional Papers in Biology.
 Lennon, B.W. and Doyle, E. Wild Food. The O'Brien Press, Dublin.

External links 

 AlgaeBase
 Palmaria palmata at Michael Guiry's Seaweed Site

Cuisine of Atlantic Canada
Icelandic cuisine
Cuisine of Northern Ireland
Irish cuisine
Florideophyceae
Edible seaweeds
Species described in 1753
Edible algae